Osama Saleh (born 1960) is an Egyptian economist, who served as the minister of investment of Egypt from 2 August 2012 to 7 May 2013. He was part of the Qandil Cabinet. He stayed as investment minister in the 2013 interim government.

Early life and education
Saleh was born in 1960. He is a graduate of the faculty of commerce at Cairo University and graduated in 1982.

Career
Saleh was the chairman of the Egyptian Mortgage Finance Authority (EMF) from 2005 to July 2009. In September 2009, he was appointed chairman of the General Authority for Investment (GAFI) under Nazif's cabinet. He is also a board member of the Egyptian Financial Supervisory Authority. In addition, he also served as Regional Manager of American Express Bank Ltd. He has been a visitor professor of finance at American University in Cairo since 2008.

In August 2012, he was appointed minister of investment as part of the Qandil cabinet. This ministry was disestablished during the Mobarak era. His term ended on 7 May 2013 and he was succeeded by Yehya Hamed in the post in a cabinet reshuffle. On 16 July 2013, Saleh was again appointed minister of investment to the interim cabinet led by Hazem Al Beblawi, replacing Yehya Hamed.

References

1960 births
Living people
Cairo University alumni
Investment ministers of Egypt
Qandil Cabinet
Beblawi Cabinet
20th-century Egyptian politicians
21st-century Egyptian politicians